Volume Magazine is a quarterly international magazine published in Amsterdam.

Volume Magazine is a project by Archis (Amsterdam), OMA (Rotterdam) and C-Lab (Columbia University, New York). Volume was created as a global idea platform to voice architecture, any way, anywhere, anytime.

Founded by Ole Bouman, Rem Koolhaas and Mark Wigley in 2005, Volume is set out to be not only a magazine, but also a studio and a school. Arjen Oosterman is the current editor-in-chief of Volume while Lilet Breddels is its director.

Volume is a dynamic experimental think tank devoted to the process of spatial and cultural reflexivity. It goes beyond architecture's definition of ‘making buildings’ and reaches out for global views on architecture and design, broader attitudes to social structures, and creating environments to live in. The project represents the expansion of architectural territories and the new mandate for design.

Many prominent architectural practitioners have worked in Volume's Amsterdam office in recent years, including Nick Axel, Amelia Borg, Brendan Cormier, Rory Hyde, Timothy Moore, and Simon Pennec.

History  
The Volume project continues Archis, magazine for Architecture, City, and Visual Culture and its predecessors since 1929. Het Katholiek Bouwblad, Goed Wonen, Wonen/TABK, and finally Archis wanted architecture to mean something. For the religious perception, for the emancipation of the working class, for the social consciousness, for philosophy, i.e. for an ideal.

Journalistic idea 
‘The art of being proactive’. Volume creates the agenda. It stands for a journalism which detects and anticipates, is proactive and even pre-emptive - a journalism which uncovers potentialities, rather than covering done deals.

References

External links
Volume Magazine
Office for Metropolitan Architecture
C-lab

 

2005 establishments in the Netherlands
Architecture magazines
Dutch-language magazines
Magazines established in 2005
Magazines published in Amsterdam
Quarterly magazines published in the Netherlands
Rem Koolhaas